Gelanoglanis is a genus of fish in the family Auchenipteridae native to South America.

Species
There are currently 5 recognized species in this genus:
 Gelanoglanis nanonocticolus Soares-Porto, S. J. Walsh, Nico & Netto, 1999
 Gelanoglanis pan Calegari, R. E. dos Reis & Vari, 2014 
 Gelanoglanis stroudi J. E. Böhlke, 1980
 Gelanoglanis travieso Rengifo & Lujan, 2008
 Gelanoglanis varii Calegari & R. E. dos Reis, 2016

References

Auchenipteridae
Catfish genera
Fish of South America
Freshwater fish genera
Taxa named by James Erwin Böhlke